Ephraim S. Fisher (November 15, 1815 – October 12, 1876) was a justice of the Mississippi High Court of Errors and Appeals (predecessor to the Supreme Court of Mississippi) from 1852 to 1860. He also served in the Mississippi Senate in the 1840s and was a candidate for governor after the Civil War.

Fisher was born near Danville, Kentucky. He moved to Mississippi in 1833 and, a brief sojourn at Vicksburg, he obtained a license to practice law and located at Coffeeville. He married, acquired a plantation and slaves in Yalobusha County. A Whig, he opposed succession, but rallied to the Confederate cause during the Civil War.

He served in the legislature during one session, and declined reelection. He attained high rank at the bar, and was in 1851 promoted to the supreme bench, where he served with "industry and ability" until the onset of the Civil War, when he resigned his position to resume the practice of law.

He was nominated for governor of Mississippi in 1865, but was at the time of his nomination in Washington city on professional business, and did not return until a few days before the election. In 1869, he was appointed to the circuit bench by Governor Alcorn. In 1876, he removed to Texas and died suddenly a few months later.

One of his sons was active in the Ku Klux Klan.

References

External links

1815 births
1876 deaths
19th-century American judges
Mississippi state senators
People from Danville, Kentucky
People from Coffeeville, Mississippi
American slave owners
Mississippi Whigs
People from Georgetown, Texas
American planters
Confederate States Army personnel
19th-century American politicians
Justices of the Mississippi Supreme Court